The Bennett Baronetcy, of Kirklington in the County of Nottingham, is a title in the Baronetage of the United Kingdom. It was created on 31 July 1929 for Albert James Bennett. He represented both Mansfield and Nottingham Central in the House of Commons. As of 2021 the title is held by his great-grandson, the fourth Baronet, who succeeded a kinsman in 2012.

Bennett baronets, of Kirklington (1929)

Sir Albert James Bennett, 1st Baronet (1872–1945)
Sir Charles Wilfrid Bennett, 2nd Baronet (1898–1952)
Sir Ronald Wilfrid Murdoch Bennett, 3rd Baronet (1930–2012)
Sir Algernon James Bennett, 4th Baronet (born 1962)

See also
Bennet baronets

References

www.thepeerage.com

Bennett